Alexander Jacob Varshavsky (born 8 November 1946) is a Russian-American biochemist, noted for his discovery of the N-end rule of ubiquitination. A native of Moscow, he is currently researching at Caltech.

Varshavsky provided an original approach to killing cancer cells, proffering the idea of a targeted molecular device that could enter a cell, examine it for DNA deletions specific to cancer and killing it if it meets the right profile.  "(It) involves, in a nutshell, the finding of a genuine Achilles' heel of cancer cells, i.e. their potentially vulnerable feature that won't change during tumor progression," said Varshavsky.

The approach termed deletion-specific targeting (DST), employs HDs (homozygous DNA deletions) as the targets of cancer therapy. "In contrast to other attributes of cancer cells, their HDs are immutable markers.  If the DST strategy can be implemented in a clinical setting, it may prove to be both curative and free of side effects."

Awards
Varshavsky was elected to the American Academy of Arts and Sciences in 1987.

He was elected to the National Academy of Sciences in 1995.

Recipient of the Gairdner Foundation International Award in 1999, Albert Lasker Award for Basic Medical Research in 2000, the Wolf Prize in Medicine, the Massry Prize from the Keck School of Medicine, University of Southern California in 2001, and the Louisa Gross Horwitz Prize from Columbia University in 2001 for his research on ubiquitination. He was elected to the American Philosophical Society that same year.

In 2006 he won the March of Dimes Prize in Developmental Biology, and he won the 2007 $1 million Gotham Prize for an original approach to killing cancer cells.

In 2010, he received the Vilcek Prize in Biomedical Science.  The following year, he received the BBVA Foundation Frontiers of Knowledge Award of Biomedicine for his discovery of the mechanisms intervening in protein degradation and their importance in biological systems. His work has implications for the understanding of cancer and immunological and neurodegenerative diseases. He also served on the Life Sciences jury for the Infosys Prize in 2011.

In 2014 he was awarded the $3 million Breakthrough Prize in Life Sciences for his work  and also the Albany Medical Center Prize.

Political positions 
In February–March 2022, he signed an open letter by Breakthrough Prize laureates condemning the 2022 Russian invasion of Ukraine.

References

Notes
 Caltech bio
 The Gotham prize

Living people
American biochemists
American people of Russian descent
Wolf Prize in Medicine laureates
American medical researchers
Russian activists against the 2022 Russian invasion of Ukraine
Members of the United States National Academy of Sciences
Recipients of the Albert Lasker Award for Basic Medical Research
1946 births
Massry Prize recipients
Schleiden Medal recipients

Members of the American Philosophical Society